Andris Ameriks (born March 5, 1961 in Jūrmala, Latvian SSR) is a Latvian politician and economist who has been serving as a Member of the European Parliament since the 2019 elections. He is a former deputy mayor of Riga.

Political career

Career in national politics
During his youth, he was a former first secretary of the Communist Youth organization of the Latvian SSR. From 1993 to 1998 he was a member of the Saeima, representing the National Harmony Party and later, Democratic Party "Saimnieks". From 2001 he has been a member of the Riga City Council, from 2010 till 2018 serving as the Deputy Chairman of Riga City Council, i.e. the deputy mayor of the Latvian capital.

Ameriks is known to be getting a significant part of his income from investments in payday loan companies. In 2017 Ameriks received the largest income among the elected municipal officials in Latvia, reporting an income of 616,386 EUR and 35,250 USD, with most of it being interest payments from Mogo non-bank lender and from the sale of securities.

Ameriks resigned as deputy mayor of Riga City Council on December 17, 2018, amid corruption allegations around Rīgas Satiksme. On December 19, 2018 members from the Riga City Council opposition initiated an unsuccessful vote of no confidence against Ameriks as a board chairman for Freeport of Riga.

Member of the European Parliament
Ameriks has been a Member of the European Parliament since the 2019 elections. He has since been serving on the Committee on Transport and Tourism and the Committee on Petitions. 

In addition to his committee assignments, Ameriks is part of the Parliament’s delegation to the EU-Kazakhstan, EU-Kyrgyzstan, EU-Uzbekistan and EU-Tajikistan Parliamentary Cooperation Committees and for relations with Turkmenistan and Mongolia. He is also a member of the European Parliament Intergroup on Western Sahara.

References 

1961 births
Living people
People from Jūrmala
Politicians from Riga
National Harmony Party politicians
Democratic Party "Saimnieks" politicians
Latvia's First Party politicians
Latvia's First Party/Latvian Way politicians
Honor to serve Riga politicians
Deputies of the 5th Saeima
Deputies of the 6th Saeima
MEPs for Latvia 2019–2024
University of Latvia alumni